Robert Didrik Pehrson (27 June 1872 – 6 May 1965)  was a Norwegian Nordic skier who won the Holmenkollen Medal in 1899 (Shared with Paul Braaten.)

References
Holmenkollen medalists - click Holmenkollmedaljen for downloadable pdf file 

Holmenkollen medalists
1872 births
1965 deaths